Ľubomír Kadnár (27 September 1941 – 11 November 2008) was a Czechoslovak sprint canoer who competed in the early 1970s. He finished ninth in the K-4 1000 m event at the 1972 Summer Olympics in Munich.

References
Ľubomír Kadnár's profile at Sports Reference.com
Ľubomír Kadnár's obituary 

1941 births
2008 deaths
Canoeists at the 1972 Summer Olympics
Czechoslovak male canoeists
Slovak male canoeists
Olympic canoeists of Czechoslovakia